Englishman's Bay is a secluded beach on the leeward coast of Tobago, between Castara and Parlatuvier. Although the bay draws fewer beach-goers that Tobago's western beaches do, it is considered one of the island's most beautiful. The beach itself is a classic crescent shape, capped by two heavily forested headlands descending from Tobago's Main Ridge. The sand starts immediately after the forest ends and is of a shallow to medium gradient and somewhat coarse grain. The beach's size changes little at high or low tides, due to the gradient. There is heavy beach break. Owing to the number of waves, the beach does not boast magnificent snorkeling. As of 2018, there is one small restaurant/gift shop, Eula's, and a single-stall male and female bathroom.
 
There are usually 20 or so people on the beach which makes it safe to leave personal items at your towel. There is plenty of space. There are both sun and shade.

References 
Tobago government's official tourism website

Beaches of Trinidad and Tobago
Bays of Trinidad and Tobago
Geography of Tobago